"My Girl" is the third single from French R&B singer Amine's album, Au delà des rêves. The song peaked at #29 in France.

Track listing
 CD single
"My Girl" (radio Edit)
"My Girl" (version Arabe)
"Win" (feat Ness Beal)

References

External links
My Girl music video

2006 singles
Amine (singer) songs
2006 songs
Song articles with missing songwriters